Jesús Hernández Moreno (born 9 January 2004) is a Mexican professional footballer who plays as a forward for Tercera Federación club Elche Ilicitano. He was included in The Guardian's "Next Generation" list for 2021.

Club career

Querétaro
Hernández made his professional debut with Querétaro under manager Héctor Altamirano on 17 August 2021 in a Liga MX match against Tigres UANL, coming on as a substitute.

International career
Hernández was part of the under-20 side that competed at the 2021 Revelations Cup, where Mexico won the competition. In June 2022, he was named into the final 20-man roster for the CONCACAF Under-20 Championship, in which Mexico failed to qualify for the FIFA U-20 World Cup and Olympics.

Career statistics

Club

Honours
Mexico U20
Revelations Cup: 2021

References

2004 births
Living people
Sportspeople from Querétaro City
Mexican footballers
Mexico youth international footballers
Association football forwards
Liga MX players
Querétaro F.C. footballers
Mexico under-20 international footballers